Eugene J. Gibbs (1869–1929) was an American architect in practice in Lewiston, Maine, from 1896 to 1929.

Life and career
Eugene J. Gibbs was born in 1869 in Lewiston to John K. Gibbs and his wife. He was raised and educated in Auburn. He was trained in architecture in the office of George M. Coombs, the leading architect in the region. In 1896 he became a partner of Coombs, in a firm variously known as Coombs, Gibbs & Wilkinson and Coombs & Gibbs. Coombs died in 1909, and Gibbs briefly continued in partnership with his son, Harry S. Coombs, who had worked with them since 1901. In 1910 Gibbs left Coombs and formed the firm of Gibbs & Pulsifer with Addison G. Pulsifer, a former employee of Coombs & Gibbs. They dissolved their partnership in 1927, and Gibbs entered private practice. He died suddenly of a stroke on March 19, 1929, at his home in Auburn.

Personal life
Gibbs was married to Grace Furbush, and they had three children. He was also an artist, having two known sketchbooks among his family.

Legacy
At least ten buildings designed by Gibbs and his partners have been listed on the United States National Register of Historic Places, and others contribute to listed historic districts.

The work of which Gibbs was most proud was the Kora Temple in Lewiston, completed in 1908, which he designed in association with Coombs.

Architectural works

Coombs, Gibbs & Wilkinson, 1896–1900

 Peck's Dept. Store, 184 Main St., Lewiston, ME (1896)
 James A. Walsh House, 253 Pine St., Lewiston, ME (1896)
 Joseph Holman House, 227 Main St., Farmington, ME (1897)
 Merrill Hall, Farmington State Normal School, Farmington ME (1897–98)
 Lewiston Trust and Safe Deposit Building, 46 Lisbon St., Lewiston, ME (1898)
 Bank Building, 38 Main St., Livermore Falls, ME (1899–1900)

Coombs & Gibbs, 1900–1910

 John D. Clifford House, 460 Main St., Lewiston, ME (1900)
 Mt. Kineo House (Remodeling) and Cottages, Northwest Piscataquis, ME (1900) – Hotel demolished.
 Masonic (Gateway) Building, 11 Lisbon St., Lewiston, ME (1901–02)
 George Bonnallie House, 485 Main St., Lewiston, ME (1902)
 Lewiston Public Library, Park & Pine Sts. Lewiston, ME (1902)
 First National Bank Building, 157 Main St., Lewiston, ME (1903)
 Fort Fairfield High School, Main & School Sts., Fort Fairfield, ME (1903) – Demolished.
 Maine Trust and Banking Co. Building, 192 Water St., Gardiner, ME (1903) – Altered.
 First National Bank Building, 18 Market Sq., Houlton, ME (1907)
 Kennebec County Courthouse Annex, 95 State St., Augusta, ME (1907)
 Philo Reed House, Main St., Fort Fairfield, ME (1907)
 Wallace H. White House, 449 Main St., Lewiston, ME (1907)
 Kora Temple, 11 Sabattus St., Lewiston, ME (1908–10)
 Clifford Building, 217 Main St., Lewiston, ME (1909)
 Gray and Staples Halls, Maine School for the Feeble-Minded, New Gloucester, ME (1909)
 Norway Grange No. 45, 15 Whitman St., Norway, ME (1909)
 Callahan Block, 282 Lisbon St., Lewiston, ME (1910)
 Main Building, Central Maine General Hospital, Lewiston, ME (1910)

Gibbs & Pulsifer, 1910–1927

 1913 – Ashe, Noyes & Small Factory (Addition), 71 Spring St, Auburn, Maine
 1913 – Eastport Primary School, Boynton St, Eastport, Maine
 1913 – Kimball Hall, Washington State Normal School, Machias, Maine
 Deteriorating and may be demolished
 1914 – Horatio G. Foss House, 19 Elm St, Auburn, Maine
 1916 – Frank M. Coffey House, 25 Webster St, Lewiston, Maine
 1916 – Ralph W. Crockett House, 443 Main St, Lewiston, Maine
 1918 – Daniel J. McGillicuddy Apartments, 84 Lisbon St, Lewiston, Maine
 1919 – Androscoggin Electric Building, 134 Main St, Lewiston, Maine
 1921 – Frank M. Coffey Apartments, 14 Leeds St, Lewiston, Maine
 1921 – Nurses' Home, Central Maine General Hospital, Hammond St, Lewiston, Maine
 1922 – Association Building, 1719 Main St, South Paris, Maine
 1923 – Ss. Cyril and Methodius Church, 51 Main St, Lisbon Falls, Maine
 1925 – Arthur L. Mann Memorial Library, 226 Main St, West Paris, Maine
 1926 – John D. Clifford House, 14 Ware St, Lewiston, Maine

References

1869 births
1929 deaths
19th-century American architects
20th-century American architects
People from Lewiston, Maine
Architects from Maine